Belža is a small municipality (village) in Slovakia in the Košice-okolie District.

It arose after 1877 by a merge of the municipalities Stredná Belža, Šándorova Belža and Vyšná Belža.

Genealogical resources

The records for genealogical research are available at the state archive "Statny Archiv in Kosice, Slovakia"

 Roman Catholic church records (births/marriages/deaths): 1714-1952 (parish B)
 Greek Catholic church records (births/marriages/deaths): 1791-1896 (parish A)
 Reformated church records (births/marriages/deaths): 1714-1952 (parish B)

See also
 List of municipalities and towns in Slovakia

External links

Surnames of living people in Belza

Villages and municipalities in Košice-okolie District